Mirjam Müntefering (born January 29, 1969 in Arnsberg, North Rhine-Westphalia) is a German author and a lesbian.

She writes about LGBT themes, but also wrote a book on dog training. In 2000, she founded the dog obedience school "HUNDherum fit" in Hattingen. Müntefering is the daughter of Franz Müntefering.

Books
 Welche Farbe auch immer oder das Blaue Gefühl
 Ada sucht Eva, Lübbe 1998
 Katta at Frauenknast.de, dtv 2000
 Hund ist in. Das Hundebuch für die neue Generation, Kynos 2000
 Ein Stück meines Herzens, dtv 2001
 Die schönen Mütter anderer Töchter, Lübbe 2001
 Tatort Ruhrgebiet: Grubenhunde, Klopp 2003
 Flug ins Apricot, Piper 2003
 Das Gegenteil von Schokolade, Lübbe 2003
 Verknallt in Camilla, Klopp 2004
 Apricot im Herzen, Piper 2004 (auch Milena 2001)
 Wenn es dunkel ist, gibt es uns nicht, Piper 2004
 Luna und Martje, Piper 2005
 Verknallt in den Traumprinzen!, Klopp 2005
 Verknallt in Mister Perfect!, Klopp 2006
 Emmas Story, Lübbe 2006
 Unversehrt Piper 2007
 Jetzt zu dritt, Lübbe 2007
 Tochter und viel mehr, Piper (forthcoming June) 2008

References

External links
 Mirjam Müntefering's official site 
 Mirjam Münteferings dog obedience school „hundherum fit“ 

1969 births
Living people
People from Arnsberg
German non-fiction writers
Lesbian novelists
Social Democratic Party of Germany politicians
German lesbian writers
German LGBT novelists
German women novelists